Turton and Entwistle Reservoir is a water reservoir in the village of Edgworth, Lancashire, England. The reservoir's existence is due to the Entwistle Dam. When constructed in 1832 the Entwistle Dam was the highest in Britain; it rises 108 feet from the base. The reservoir contains almost 750 thousand imperial gallons (roughly 3,400,000 litres) and, with the Wayoh Reservoir just below, satisfies around 50% of Bolton's need for drinking water.

Entwistle Dam was designed by Thomas Ashworth, a local land surveyor, overseen by Jesse Hartley, the Liverpool Docks engineer. Other works were by Joseph Jackson, an engineer and surveyor from Bolton. It was built for the Commissioners of the Turton and Entwistle Reservoir, a group of local mill owners who obtained an enabling Act of Parliament in 1832 to regulate the supply of water in Bradshaw Brook for water power for the finishing textiles.

Records suggest it was built entirely of puddle clay with no distinct core. Earth dams usually have a waterproof cutoff under their earthworks designed to stop seepage under the dam but it is doubtful whether there was any such a cutoff at Entwistle. The reservoir has a rock-cut outlet tunnel driven through the valley side rather than a culvert or pipeline and a siphon draw-off pipe. The dam is 108 ft high and 110 metres long at the crest. The present overflow channel and valve tower were added by the Bolton Corporation Water Works who took over the reservoir in 1864.

References 

Drinking water reservoirs in England
Buildings and structures in Blackburn with Darwen
Reservoirs in Lancashire